Bedauli is a village development committee in Kapilvastu District in the Lumbini Zone of southern Nepal. At the time of the 2001 Nepal census it had a population of 5819 people living in 1404 individual households.

References

Populated places in Kapilvastu District